Salmon River Airfield  is located in Colchester, Connecticut, United States.

Facilities and Aircraft
Salmon River Airfield is situated 3 miles south of the central business district, and contains one runway.  The longest runway, 17/35, is turf measuring 2,000 x 60 ft (610 x 18 m).

For the 12-month period ending July 1, 2008, the airport had 804 aircraft operations, an average of 67 per month: 62% local general aviation, and 38% transient general aviation. At that time there were 8 aircraft based at this airport: 87% single-engine and 13% helicopter.

References

Airports in Connecticut
Transportation buildings and structures in New London County, Connecticut
Colchester, Connecticut